Muhanad is a masculine given name.

List of people with the surname 

 Muhanad Al-Halak (born 1989), Iraqi-German politician
 Muhanad Madyen (born 1994), Libyan footballer
 Muhanad Mahmoud Al Farekh, American terrorist

See also 

 Mohannad
 Muhammad (name)

Given names
Masculine given names
Arabic masculine given names